Ayad Mohammed Ali  (born 1 July 1956) is an Iraqi former football defender who played for Iraq at the 1977 FIFA World Youth Championship. 

Ayad played for the national team in 1978.

References

Iraqi footballers
Iraq international footballers
Living people
Association football defenders
1956 births